Sam Lassner, better known by his stage name Prince Fox or his alias SMWN  is an American Songwriter and producer from Manhattan, New York. He gained notability after remixing songs for 3LAU, Cazzette and SNBRN. He later caught the attention of Casablanca Records, a label owned by Universal Music Group and operated under Republic Records. He was then signed to Casablanca in 2015.

Early life 
Lassner began his career by playing guitar, inspired by John Mayer. He started producing electronic music when he first visited Electric Zoo, an electronic music festival. He began using the stage name "Prince Fox" from the book "The Little Prince" based on two characters -– a prince and a fox. However, prior to becoming known by his stage name, his close friends referred to him as Franklin, in reference to his resemblance to the cartoon turtle. He attends his classes at New York University's Steinhardt Music Technology program.

Musical style 
His music was described as "future pop". His biggest inspirations are John Mayer, Skrillex, and Chris Martin describing them as a "three-way tie".

Career 
His Musings EP was released in October 2015. “I Don’t Wanna Love You” was released as a single through Casablanca Records.

He released "Fragile", a collaboration with Hailee Steinfeld as a single. He lost his grandfather before the song was created. Lassner spoke of the collaboration, describing it as 'superstitious' fate. His late-grandfather and Steinfeld share the same birthday date (December 11). "Fragile" was first presented to Lassner by his songwriter-friend Lil Aaron. He then re-arranged it and produced with a style he calls "future pop". When he sent the song to Steinfeld before reworking the lyrics to fit her voice.

He later collaborated with Michelle Buzz to release "Oxygen", a single inspired by the death of his god-grandmother Shirley who died due to lung cancer. Lassner described the song as 'one of the most personal, near and dear songs he's worked on'.

Discography

Studio albums

Extended plays

Singles

Remixes

2014 
 3LAU featuring Bright Lights – How You Love Me (Prince Fox Remix)
 Sam Smith – Stay With Me (Prince Fox Remix)
 Florence & The Machine – You've Got The Love (Prince Fox Remix)
 CAZZETTE – Blind Heart (Prince Fox Remix)

2015 
 Kanye West – All Of The Lights (Prince Fox x Hotel Garuda Cover)
 Beyonce – Crazy In Love (Prince Fox Remix)
 Kimbra – Settle Down (Prince Fox Remix)
 SNBRN featuring Kerli – Raindrops (Prince Fox Remix)
 Prince Fox – Wait Until Tomorrow (Prince Fox VIP)
 DJ Khaled featuring Moonzz – All I Do Is Win (Prince Fox Cover)
 Felix Jaehn featuring Jasmine Thompson – Ain't Nobody (Loves Me Better) (Prince Fox Remix)
 Atlas Bound – Tell Me (Prince Fox Remix)

2017 
 Hey Violet – Guys My Age (Prince Fox Remix)
 Prince Fox - Just Call (Prince Fox VIP)

2019 
 Nikki Vianna and Matoma - When You Leave (Prince Fox Remix)

2020 
 Krewella - Anxiety (Prince Fox Remix)
 Jaymes Young - Happiest Year (Prince Fox Remix)

References 

Deep house musicians
1992 births
People from Manhattan
Casablanca Records artists
American DJs
American electronic musicians
Living people
Electronic dance music DJs
Remixers